XF is a letter grade used at some U.S. colleges, to denote either students who withdraw from a course after the refund period has lapsed  or who are caught performing acts of academic dishonesty. This was intended to make it evident from the transcript why the failing grade was assigned, though critics have pointed to inconsistent grading schema among universities issuing XF grades.  The XF variation is also used by at least one institution to indicate a student who has failed a course due to non-attendance.

The earliest instance of the XF grade occurred at the University of Maryland, College Park, and XFs have been assigned for plagiarists at Kansas State University since 2000.  Pennsylvania State University and East Carolina University have also recently adopted the practice.  At Kansas, students with XF grades may have the grade changed to a regular "F" by enrolling in an academic integrity course.

Students at Wichita State University, who did not wish for "F"s on their transcript to be mistaken for academic dishonesty, requested adoption of the XF by their university. Students at Thomas Edison State University requested that XF grades gained from missing the withdrawal deadline be omitted from official transcripts, leading to a policy change within the university. This is notable in that the discussion was sparked, in part, by inconsistent grading policies among universities issuing XF grades.

References

See also
Academic dishonesty
Grade (education)

2000 introductions
Education issues
Student assessment and evaluation